Altocumulus (From Latin Altus, "high", cumulus, "heaped") is a middle-altitude cloud genus that belongs mainly to the stratocumuliform physical category characterized by globular masses or rolls in layers or patches, the individual elements being larger and darker than those of cirrocumulus and smaller than those of stratocumulus.  However, if the layers become tufted in appearance due to increased airmass instability, then the altocumulus clouds become more purely cumuliform in structure.  Like other cumuliform and stratocumuliform clouds, altocumulus signifies convection. A sheet of partially conjoined altocumulus perlucidus is sometimes found preceding a weakening warm front, where the altostratus is starting to fragment, resulting in patches of altocumulus perlucidus between the areas of altostratus. Altocumulus is also commonly found between the warm and cold fronts in a depression, although this is often hidden by lower clouds.

Towering altocumulus, known as altocumulus castellanus, frequently signals the development of thunderstorms later in the day, as it shows instability and convection in the middle levels of the troposphere (the lowest layer of the atmosphere), the area where towering cumulus clouds can turn into cumulonimbus. It is therefore one of three warning clouds often recorded by the aviation industry, the other two being towering cumulus and cumulonimbus. Extensive altocumulus formations, particularly if they take the form of undulatus are often referred to as altocumulus mackerel sky.

Subtypes

Species:  Altocumulus has four species.  The stratiformis species (Ac str) is composed of sheets or relatively flat patches of stratocumuliform cloud.  The synoptic coding is determined by the predominant variety or occasionally by the genitus mother cloud. Altocumulus lenticularis (Ac len lenticular cloud) is a lens-shaped middle cloud which can resemble flying saucers and may occasionally be mistaken for "unidentified flying objects". This is formed by uplift usually associated with mountains. but usually with at least some grey shading. It is coded CM4 on the SYNOP weather observation. Grey shading is also seen with altocumulus castellanus (Ac cas), a turreted middle cloud that can achieve significant vertical development and signals increasing air mass instability. It is nevertheless usually classified as middle rather than vertical and is coded CM8. The floccus species (Ac flo) is a tufted middle cloud which is also associated with greater instability. It shares the same code CM8. Chaotic altocumulus, which is typically poorly defined with multiple species or transitional forms arranged in several layers, is coded CM9.
Opacity-based varieties:  Altocumulus stratiformis has three opacity-based varieties; Translucidus (CM3), perlucidus (CM3 or 7 depending on predominant opacity), and opacus (CM7). Varieties based on opacity are not commonly associated with the species lenticularis, castellanus, or floccus.
Pattern-based varieties: Radiatus (arranged in parallel bands) is sometimes seen with the stratformis and castellanus species.  Altocumulus stratiformis radiatus of any opacity is coded CM5 if it is increasing in amount.  The duplicatus or undulatus varieties are occasionally seen with the stratiformis and lenticularis species.  Altocumulus stratiformis duplicatus is coded CM7 if it is not overridden by another coding of higher importance.  Lacunosus is very occasionally associated with altocumulus of the species stratiformis, castellanus, or floccus.
Precipitation-based supplementary feature: Altocumulus often produces virga but usually not precipitation that reaches the ground.
Cloud-based supplementary feature: Mamma caused by localized downdrafts in the cloud layer are occasionally seen with altocumulus. A newly recognized type is the asperitas feature that is characterized by chaotic undulations caused by severe wind shear. 

Genitus Mother clouds: Altocumulus stratiformis cumulogenitus or cumulonimbogenitus can form when the middle or upper part of a towering free convective cloud begins to spread horizontally due to a loss of convective lift.  It is coded CM6.
Mutatus mother clouds: Altocumulus can form due to the complete transformation of cirrocumulus, altostratus, nimbostratus, or stratocumulus.

Gallery

See also
 Atmospheric convection
 Mackerel sky

References

External links

 International Cloud Atlas – Altocumulus
 Clouds-Online.com Cloud Atlas with many photos and description of the different cloud genus
National Science Digital Library – Altocumulus
 Altocumulus
 WW2010: University of Illinois

Cumulus